Randwick is a suburb in the Eastern Suburbs of Sydney, in the state of New South Wales, Australia. Randwick is located 6 kilometres south-east of the Sydney central business district and is the administrative centre for the local government area of the City of Randwick. The postcode is 2031.

History
Randwick was named after the village of Randwick, Gloucestershire, England, birthplace of Simeon Henry Pearce, who became Mayor of Randwick six times. Simeon, who migrated to Australia in 1842, and his brother James who arrived in 1848, were responsible for the founding and early development of Randwick. Simeon built the first stone house in the area in 1848, called Blenheim House, which can still be seen in Blenheim Street. It was neglected for some time in the mid-1900s, but was eventually acquired by Randwick City Council and restored.

Proclaimed as a Municipality in February 1859, and as a City in 1990, Randwick has a rich history and a number of heritage buildings. Another Mayor of Randwick, George Kiss, lived in the house known as Ventnor in the 1870s. A two-storey sandstone house, Ventnor was built by Alderman Edward Dawson in 1859, and is situated on Avoca Street, overlooking Coogee. It is now owned by the nearby Our Lady of the Sacred Heart Church (built 1888). Other buildings of note include the St Jude's Church group, also on Avoca Street. Originally designed by Edmund Blacket, (who also designed St. Andrew's Cathedral, Sydney and the University of Sydney), the church was completed in 1865. It was modified by H.M. Robinson in 1889. The rectory next door was built in 1870. The Verger's Residence, designed by Thomas Rowe and completed in 1862, was the original Randwick Municipal Chambers. This distinctive building, with its Gothic touches, was followed by the present Randwick Town Hall, which was built further north in Avoca Street in 1881. The church group and Ventnor are listed on the Register of the National Estate.

Further south down Avoca Street is the sandstone building with a tower, built in 1859 as an investment property by William Ellis, one of Randwick's first six elected aldermen. After briefly being used as the 'Star and Garter' Inn by Mrs Elizabeth Shipway, it was later the home of Captain Thomas Watson, who was responsible for commissioning the 1874 statue of Captain James Cook, sculpted by Walter McGill, which still stands at the south side of the building. Captain Watson also heightened the square tower, thus ensuring another distinctive landmark feature of the area.
Close by is another even more imposing building in Randwick's heartland - the Prince of Wales Hospital, which started life as the Randwick Asylum for Destitute Children. Opened in 1858, it was partly financed by the legacy of Dr. Cuthill, whose name is commemorated by the adjacent Cuthill Street. The southern wing was added in 1863, by which time over 800 children were being cared for. In 1915 the Asylum buildings were finally deemed unsuitable as premises in which to provide a realistic home life for children, and they were then adapted for WWI use as a military and repatriation hospital. In 1953 the complex was officially renamed as the Prince of Wales Hospital, which continues to grow as a renowned medical facility.

Other noteworthy buildings include private homes like Ilfracombe, Clovelly and Torquay in Avoca Street, and Venice, in Frenchmans Road. The latter was built 1884–84 on part of St Mark's Glebe. The land had been leased in 1880 for 99 years to S.Holmes and J.Parsons. The house features Tudor and Gothic elements and has stained glass windows. It has been described as a "comparatively rare and distinctive example of late Victorian Gothic architecture retaining most of its detailing intact." It has a New South Wales heritage listing.

Another notable home was Sandgate, located in Belmore Road. This sandstone house was built circa 1870 on Crown land purchased by Simeon Pearce in 1853. It was bought by the Federal Government in the 1920s; it was then used as a Red Cross facility for First World War veterans. It was saved from demolition in 1978 and restored by Randwick Council.

The last Gothic mansion left in Randwick is Nugal Hall, located in Milford Street. It was designed by Mortimer Lewis and the southern portion of the house was built in 1853 for Alexander McArthur, a shipping merchant. The house features a staircase with glass dome above; the staircase was built of Mauritius mahogany and cedar. The coach house building at the front was originally a lodge for horse-drawn vehicles. The northern portion of the house was completed by Dr Fred Tidswell who owned the Coogee Bay Hotel. The architect of the northern portion is thought to have been Mortimer Lewis's son, Oswald. The Tidswell family owned the house from c. 1880 – 1903. Frederick Squire Tidswell (1831–1898) and his wife Mary Ann (1836–1912) had nine children including the microbiologist Dr Frank Tidswell (1867–1941) and architect Thomas Tidswell (1870–1950).

Heritage listings 
 

Randwick has a number of heritage-listed sites, including the following sites listed on the New South Wales State Heritage Register:
 124 Alison Road: Randwick Post Office
 162 Alison Road: Randwick Presbyterian Church
 102-108 Avoca Street: St Jude's Church, Randwick
 211-215 Avoca Street: Corana and Hygeia
 128 Belmore Road: Sandgate, Randwick
 60 Bundock Lane: Electricity Substation No. 341
 66 Frenchmans Road: Venice, Randwick
 17 Gilderthorpe Avenue: Hooper Cottage
 16-18 Milford Street: Nugal Hall
 2S Frances Street: Electricity Substation No. 349
 43 St Marks Road: Rathven, Randwick
 43 St Pauls Street: Ritz Cinema, Sydney
 18-20 Stanley Street: Emanuel School, Australia
 26-42 The Avenue: Avonmore Terrace
 29-39 Young Street: Big Stable Newmarket

The following structures are listed on the (now defunct) Register of the National Estate (unless stated otherwise), or the heritage schedule of Randwick Council's Local Environment Plan; the latter list includes approximately four hundred items.

 Ventnor
 Original Randwick Borough Chambers
 Goldring House and Attached Residence
 Prince of Wales Hospital Group
 Our Lady of the Sacred Heart Church
 The Park, Avoca and Cuthill Streets
 Ilfracrombe, Avoca Street, (circa 1906)
 Torquay, Avoca Street, (circa 1906)
 Clovelly, Avoca Street, (circa 1906)
 Newmarket House and The Big Stable, Barker and Young Streets
 Captain James Cook Statue, corner Belmore Road and Avoca Street
 Hannan's Butcher Shop (former Star and Garter Inn), Belmore Road
 Former Randwick Police Station, Coogee Bay Road
 Peckham, Cowper Street
 Essex, Cuthill Street
 House, 11 Cuthill Street
 Royal Hotel, Cuthill Street
 Shaldon, Darley Road
 Swan Isle, Darley Road
 Gordon Terrace, Gordon Street
 Members' Stand, Randwick Racecourse
 Busby Bore (Tunnel from Lachlan Swamp to Hyde Park, City)
 Tayar, The Avenue

Demographics
In the 2021 Census, there were 28,943 people in Randwick, of which 52.9% were female and 47.1% were male. The most common ancestries in Randwick were 31.1% English, 22.2% Australian and 17.8% Irish. 73.5% of people only spoke English at home. Other languages spoken at home included 2.4% Mandarin, 1.9% Spanish, 1.5% Greek, 1.4% Portuguese and 1.3% French. The most common responses for religion were 41.0% No Religion, 26.0%  Roman Catholicism, 8.1% Anglicanism and 4.9% Judaism. The median weekly household income in Randwick was $2,442, which was 28.5% higher than the national median.

Commercial area
Randwick is primarily a residential area. The Randwick Racecourse takes up a large portion in the north-west corner of the suburb. The Prince of Wales Hospital, Royal Hospital for Women, Sydney Children's Hospital and the Prince of Wales Private Hospital together occupy the Randwick Hospitals' Campus, a large contiguous campus bounded by Barker Street, Avoca Street, High Street and Hospital Road. A number of teaching and research facilities are also located on the campus. The campus is being expanded under a major project called the "Randwick Campus Redevelopment" project, which will see it expand west to the suburb boundary with Kensington and Kingsford. Prince Henry Hospital is also in Randwick.

The main commercial area is centred on Belmore Road. A range of retail stores are located at Belmore Road along with two shopping centers (Royal Randwick Shopping Centre and Randwick Plaza, which contains a Coles Supermarket) on eitherside of Belmore Road. Avoca Street is also quite popular for commerce, there is the 150-year-old Coach and Horses Hotel. Where the two busy streets meet is the gourmet Cookhouse, a heritage sandstone building with a statue of Captain Cook outside and High Cross Park, with a war memorial. Within one kilometer, Coogee is another retail precinct offering good food services while enjoying the great view of the beach. The Spot at the Perouse and St Pauls Road junction also wins good fame for its popular restaurants, cafés and recreational facilities. Randwick's main entertainment district is The Spot, located in the suburb's south-east, which contains the Randwick Ritz cinema, a famous art deco cinema which dates from the 1930s and numerous cafes, bars and restaurants.

Churches
 Our Lady of the Sacred Heart Catholic Church 
 St Jude's Anglican Church 
 East Sydney Community Christian Church, 
 Randwick Presbyterian Church, 
 Canvas Church 
 Rhema Church of God.

Sport and recreation 

Just 6 kilometres east of Sydney's CBD, the City of Randwick, once known as the 'Sports Coast' is home to some 29 km of coastline, 10 beaches and bays and many major recreation facilities. Randwick City is one of the most visited tourist areas outside central Sydney, attracting some 13 million visits each year. The city is home to the Coastal Walkway, Randwick Racecourse, Coogee and Maroubra Beaches, Botany Bay National Park, Centennial Parklands (which includes Queens Park and Moore Park), several top class golf courses and major institutions including the University of New South Wales and the Prince of Wales Hospitals.

A number of well-known sporting teams represent the local area. Since 1882 the Randwick District Rugby Union Football Club nicknamed the 'Galloping Greens' or 'The Wicks' have represented the district in the Sydney premier grade rugby competition, the 'Shute Shield' and play their home games at the picturesque Coogee Oval. The local cricket team Randwick Petersham Cricket Club plays in the Sydney Grade Cricket domestic competition and was formed through a merger between Randwick and Petersham Cricket Clubs.

Randwick is represented in the National Rugby League by the Sydney Roosters, formally the Eastern Suburbs District Rugby League Football Club. Junior rugby league teams include the Clovelly Crocodiles, the Coogee Dolphins and Coogee Randwick Wombats.

The former Randwick Post Office building in the centre of Randwick Junction (corner of Alison Road and Avoca Street) is known as Easts House.  The building is owned by the  Sydney Roosters (Eastern Suburbs Rugby League Club), which has donated the building for use by the Ted Noffs Foundation, for the purpose of providing assistance to troubled youth in the district. There are numerous community or corner parks like Alison Park, Randwick Peace Park, Frank Doyle Park, Fred Hollows Reserve and Writtle Park in the locality of Randwick used for recreational and sporting purposes.

Schools

Primary schools in the area include Our Lady of the Sacred Heart, Coogee Public School, Claremont College, Randwick Public School, Coogee Preparatory School, and Rainbow Street Primary. Secondary schools include two systemic Catholic schools, Brigidine College and Marcellin College, a Jewish day school Emanuel School and three state schools, Randwick Boys High School, Randwick Girls' High School, and the Open High School. Randwick North High School was closed in 2001 and the site was divided between Open High School and Randwick Public School.

There are branch campuses of the University of New South Wales and Sydney Institute of TAFE located on King Street, between the Racecourse and Centennial Park.

Transport

Until December 2019 Randwick was only served by buses. The main bus corridor is Belmore Rd with buses to Bondi Junction, Coogee, Eastgardens, Maroubra, Sydney Airport and Sydney CBD.

On 13 December 2012, the NSW Government announced a commitment to build the CBD and South East Light Rail from Circular Quay down George Street to Central Station, then across to Moore Park and down Anzac Parade. South of Moore Park the line splits into two branches; one of which heads to Randwick via Alison Road. A bus/tram interchange will be established in Randwick and many of the bus routes that currently traverse Anzac Parade to access the city will be replaced by feeder routes connecting to the light rail. Construction commenced in 2015 and services on the Randwick branch commenced in December 2019.

References

External links

 Randwick Historical Society
 Randwick City Council website
 2001 Census Information
 Randwick City Tourism website
 Randwick photos at Flickr.com
 Council and Community Engagement Website

 
Suburbs of Sydney